Advocate Kagda Chandya Padvi is a member of the Maharashtra Legislative Assembly since 1990. He is Minister of Tribal Affairs in Maharashtra Government. He represents the  Akkalkuwa (ST) Assembly Constituency. He belongs to the Indian National Congress. In 2004 he represented the 84 - Akrani (ST) Assembly Constituency.

References

Maharashtra MLAs 2014–2019
People from Nandurbar district
Maharashtra MLAs 2004–2009
Living people
Year of birth missing (living people)
Marathi politicians
Maharashtra MLAs 2019–2024
Indian National Congress politicians from Maharashtra